The National Football Stadium, also known as the Galolhu Rasmee Dhandu Stadium, is a multi-purpose stadium in Malé, Maldives. It is used mostly for football matches of the Dhivehi League, FAM Cup, and International matches. The stadium holds around 11,000 spectators. The stadium was renovated to upgrade certain facilities including a media box for 2014 AFC Challenge Cup and was re-branded as National Football Stadium.

References

Football venues in the Maldives
Multi-purpose stadiums
Sport in Malé